Fadela Echebbi (23 January 1946) is a Tunisian poet. Echebbi was born in Tozeur, Tunisia, on 23 January 1946, the cousin of the famous Tunisian poet Aboul-Qacem Echebbi. 

In 1971, she obtained her diploma in Arabic literature, from the Faculty of humanities and social sciences in Tunis.

Works
 Smells of the earth and the anger (1973).
 Roar of the morning (2002). 
 Depression of the wind (2003).

References

People from Tozeur
Tunisian women poets
20th-century Tunisian poets
1946 births
Living people
Tunis University alumni
20th-century Tunisian women writers
20th-century Tunisian writers
21st-century Tunisian women writers
21st-century Tunisian writers
21st-century Tunisian poets